Aleksandar Mitsev (born 17 May 1935) is a Bulgarian boxer. He competed in the men's light welterweight event at the 1960 Summer Olympics.

References

1935 births
Living people
Bulgarian male boxers
Olympic boxers of Bulgaria
Boxers at the 1960 Summer Olympics
Light-welterweight boxers